The Cancer of Superstition is a manuscript by C. M. Eddy, Jr. that investigates ideas and trends of superstition throughout history. C. M. Eddy, Jr. and H. P. Lovecraft were commissioned to write a book on the subject by famed magician and escapologist Harry Houdini from an outline provided by Lovecraft.

Background
The incomplete 31-page manuscript was discovered in a collection of materials procured by a private collector from a magic shop that had closed. Houdini and Lovecraft scholars knew of the book previously, but until this incomplete manuscript (which has pages missing) was found in 2016, no version of the work was known to exist.  It remains unclear what parts were written by Eddy and what by Lovecraft. A synopsis of the book, as well as a single chapter titled "The Genesis of Superstition", was published in the 1966 as part of the book The Dark Brotherhood and Other Pieces.

In The Dark Brotherhood and Other Pieces 1966 August Derleth writes:

In The 13 Gates of the Necronomican: A Workbook of Magic (2012) author Donald Tyson referred to the Lovecraft/Houdini collaboration as follows:

Tyson misidentifies Eddy as Barlow in the above quote and book.

Conclusion
Both Lovecraft as a writer of horror fiction and Houdini as an illusionist relied on people's superstitions in their careers, playing on audiences' and readers' senses of the unknown for heightened entertainment, while also advocating for greater skepticism in society.

Legacy
In April 2016, the typewritten manuscript sold at auction for $33,600.

References

American essays
Books by H. P. Lovecraft
Manuscripts
Unfinished books